

Television

2020s

2010s

2000s

1990s

1980s

Radio

2010s

2000s

1990s

1980s

See also
List of current National Basketball Association broadcasters

Charlotte Bobcats announcers
Charlotte Bobcats
Prime Sports
Fox Sports Networks
Bally Sports